Vysokaje is a town in Brest Region, Belarus. The westernmost point of Belarus is located a few kilometers to the southwest from Vysokaje town on the Bug River.

It is at an altitude of 524 feet. The approximate population for a 7 kilometer area from this point is 2300 people. There is a conflicting report that in 1991 the population was 5200 people. This city has a railway station on the Brest line.

Etymology 
Vysokaje means "high" (same as ), as in Wysokie Litewskie (Lithuanian Heights). That was also its name before 1940, when it belonged to Poland. It is about 15 kilometers from Polish border and majority of its citizens are Polish.

History 
Within the Grand Duchy of Lithuania, Vysokaje was part of Brest Litovsk Voivodeship. In 1795, Vysokaje was acquired by the Russian Empire as a result of the Third Partition of Poland.

From 1921 until 1939, Vysokaje (Wysokie Litewskie) was part of the Second Polish Republic. In September 1939, Vysokaje was occupied by the Red Army and, on 14 November 1944, incorporated into the Byelorussian SSR.

From 23 June 1941 until 28 July 1944, Vysokaje was occupied by Nazi Germany and administered as a part of Bezirk Bialystok.

References

External links 
 Wysokie Litewskie in the Geographical Dictionary of the Kingdom of Poland (1895)  
 

Towns in Belarus
Populated places in Brest Region
Brest Litovsk Voivodeship
Brestsky Uyezd
Polesie Voivodeship
Kamenets District